"Tingalingaling" (also credited as Tingeling) is the thirteenth single by the Dutch girl group Luv', released in the summer of 1981 by CNR/Carrere Records. The song appears on the Forever Yours album and the Goodbye Luv' compilation. It was meant to be Luv's farewell to their public. The members of the female pop act didn't know at this time they would make several reunions in the future.

Background
My Number One was a smash hit in Benelux, proving that Luv's new member Ria Thielsch (who replaced Patty Brard) was accepted by the public. However, just before Christmas 1980, Marga Scheide became overworked and had to be on sick leave until February 1981. The group had to stop all its activities. In early March 1981, Luv's break-up was announced in the media. A Dutch radio DJ, Hugo van Gelderen, often played "Tingalingaling" (an uptempo post-disco and synth-pop track taken from the Forever Yours album) on TROS station. The song was so popular among the TROS listeners and Luv's fans that Carrere Records decided to release it as a single. The group made a farewell performance on July 22nd, 1981 on the "Nederland Muziekland" show on Veronica (TV channel) in Spakenburg to promote what was supposed to be their final single. Then, a compilation entitled Goodbye Luv', including the trio's repertoire from 1979 to 1981, came out.

Commercial performance
Due to a limited promotion by the Luv' singers, "Tingalingaling" only charted in the Netherlands and was a moderate hit in comparison with the million-sellers You're the Greatest Lover and Trojan Horse.

Charts

Weekly charts

Year-end charts

References

External links
 Lyrics to Tingalingaling

1980 songs
1981 singles
Luv' songs
Songs written by Hans van Hemert
Songs written by Piet Souer
Carrere Records singles